Defer may refer to:

 Defer Elementary School, a Michigan State Historic Site
 Deference, the acknowledgement of the legitimacy of the power of one's superior or superiors
 Deferral, the delaying of the realization of an asset or liability until a future date

See also

 DeFer
 Differ (disambiguation)